The following is a list of operas by Giacomo Meyerbeer (1791–1864).


List of operas

Notes and sources

Notes

Sources
 
 Becker, Heinz (1980). "Meyerbeer [Meyer Beer], Giacomo [Jakob Liebmann]". In Sadie, Stanley, The New Grove Dictionary of Music and Musicians, vol. 12, 246–256. London: Macmillan
 Becker, Heinz and Gudrun Becker, tr. Mark Violette (1989). Giacomo Meyerbeer, a Life in Letters. London: Christopher Helm. .
 Huebner, Steven (1992). "Meyerbeer, Giacomo". In Sadie, Stanley, The New Grove Dictionary of Opera, 4: 366–371. London: Macmillan. .
 Letellier, Robert Ignatius (2006). The Operas of Giacomo Meyerbeer. Cranbury: Associated University Presses. 
 Meyerbeer, Giacomo (1960–2006). Briefwechsel und Tagebücher (8 vols.). Berlin and New York: de Gruyter.

External links
 

Lists of operas by composer
 
Lists of compositions by composer